
Marias or Marías may refer to:

Places 

Islas Marías, a Mexican archipelago
Marías District, in Dos de Mayo province, Peru
Marias River, a tributary of the Missouri River
Marías, Aguada, Puerto Rico, a barrio
Marías, Añasco, Puerto Rico, a barrio
Marías, Moca, Puerto Rico, a barrio

People 

 Javier Marías, Spanish author, born 1951
 Notis Marias, Greek political scientist and politician, born 1957

Other 

 Mariáš (card game), a trick-taking card game
 The Marías, an indie psychedelic rock/soul band
 Alternate name for María biscuits

See also
 :es:Marías, a disambiguation page in Spanish Wikipedia